Arthur James Bettles (25 March 1891 – 10 July 1971) was an Australian rules footballer who played in the Victorian Football League (VFL) between 1914 and 1920 for the Richmond Football Club.

References 

 Hogan P: The Tigers of Old, Richmond FC, Melbourne 1996

External links

Richmond Football Club players
Australian rules footballers from Victoria (Australia)
1891 births
1971 deaths